Steppin' Out is a weekly entertainment industry-oriented magazine published by Larry Collins that bills itself as "New York and New Jersey's #1 Entertainment Magazine".  The magazine was first published in September 1988. The main feature of each issue is its cover feature, an interview of a celebrity. The rest of the magazine consists of film reviews, entertainment industry gossip, regular columns and features by various contributors, horoscopes, information on local area events, and classified ads. The magazine boasts a readership of over 50,000 in print and countless more online and on social media.

The magazine maintains an online presence at so-mag.com, where web surfers can read the entire contents of the current issue on a flip page, as well as order back issues.

Contributors
Larry Collins began Steppin' Out magazine with his wife Pamela in his parent's basement in 1988. The magazine got the most promotion on The Howard Stern Show when he had Chaunce Hayden on as a frequent guest. Hayden was the chief editor and wrote many of the articles. Dan Lorenzo was promoted to editor in January 2012. Lorenzo also does ad sales.

References

External links

Entertainment magazines published in the United States
Lifestyle magazines published in the United States
Magazines established in 1988
Magazines published in New Jersey
Weekly magazines published in the United States